The 32nd Army Corps was an Army corps in the Imperial Russian Army.

Composition

Part of
9th Army: 1915
8th Army: 1915 - 1916
11th Army: 1916

Corps of the Russian Empire